Harold Leo Credlin (16 June 1903 – 27 March 1983) was an Australian rules footballer who played with Carlton and North Melbourne in the Victorian Football League (VFL).

Notes

External links 

Leo Credlin's profile at Blueseum
 

1903 births
1983 deaths
Carlton Football Club players
North Melbourne Football Club players
Australian rules footballers from Victoria (Australia)